The Twin Buttes Archeological District is a prehistoric Anasazi village site, with historical significance for the period from 1000 B.C. through 500 A.D.

See also
 
 
 National Register of Historic Places listings in Apache County, Arizona
 National Register of Historic Places listings in Petrified Forest National Park

References

National Register of Historic Places in Apache County, Arizona
Historic sites in Arizona
Apache County, Arizona
National Register of Historic Places in Petrified Forest National Park